The 1985–86 South Pacific cyclone season was an average tropical cyclone season, in terms of tropical cyclone formation, with ten tropical cyclones occurring within the basin between 160°E and 120°W. The season ran from February 5, 1985, to May 22, 1986, with tropical cyclones officially monitored by the Fiji Meteorological Service (FMS), Australian Bureau of Meteorology (BoM) and New Zealand's MetService. The United States Joint Typhoon Warning Center (JTWC) and other national meteorological services including Météo-France and NOAA also monitored the basin during the season. During the season there was nine tropical cyclones occurring within the basin, including three that moved into the basin from the Australian region.


Seasonal summary 

During November and December no significant tropical cyclones developed in or moved into the basin in the region,

Systems

Severe Tropical Cyclone Ima 

Severe Tropical Cyclone Ima existed from February 5 to February 16.

Ima affected French Polynesia's Austral, Society and Tubuai Islands, from February 9–14 and caused extensive damage to Rimatara.

Tropical Cyclone June 

On February 5, TCWC Nadi (a.k.a. Fiji Meteorological Service) reported that a tropical depression had developed early on February 10. About 24 hours later, the system intensified into a Category 1 cyclone on the Australian intensity scale. Around that same time, the Naval Pacific Meteorology and Oceanography Center followed suit by upgrading the system into a tropical storm. Gradually intensifying, Nadi estimated that June had peaked in intensity with winds of  late on February 7. Meanwhile, the JTWC reported that Tropical Cyclone June had also peaked in intensity. By February 9, June had weakened into a tropical depression. June was no longer a tropical cyclone by the morning.

Tropical Cyclone Keli 

Tropical Cyclone Keli existed from February 8 to February 14.

Tropical Cyclone Lusi 

According to the Vanuatu Meteorological Service, there was no significant damage reported within Vanuatu.

Tropical Cyclone Alfred 

Tropical Cyclone Alfred existed from March 7 to March 11.

Severe Tropical Cyclone Martin 

Severe Tropical Cyclone Martin from April 10 to April 15.

Severe Tropical Cyclone Namu 

Over the next two days the system moved towards the southeast before it recurved, and started to move towards the southwest during May 17 as it started to show signs that it was developing further. After the system had acquired the characteristics of a tropical cyclone and become equivalent to a tropical storm, the United States Joint Typhoon Warning Center started to issue warnings on the system and designated it as Tropical Cyclone 33P.

Cyclone Namu was responsible for the deaths of 103 people and caused US$100 million in economic losses in the Solomon Islands. It was considered the worst tropical cyclone to impact the area in five years. Much of the damage caused by Namu was due to phenomenal flooding, and was widespread across the island chain. At Honiara International Airport,  of rain was measured over a three-day period. Increased river flow caused by the depositing of saturated material in rivers was the cause for much of the flood damage that occurred. Of all the islands, Malaita was the worst affected by the cyclone. On the island of Guadalcanal, a single mudslide was responsible for killing 38 villagers. Attaining a clean water supply was an issue on Guadalcanal, and 22% of homes on the island were either damaged or destroyed.

As a result of the havoc caused by the cyclone, approximately 90,000 people, equal to a third of the country's population, were reported as homeless. The government of the Solomon Islands declared a national state of emergency for the entirety of the island chain. The United Kingdom, Papua New Guinea, the United States, and Japan also sent supplies and goods to the Solomon Islands.

Season effects 
This table lists all the storms that developed in the South Pacific basin during the 1985–86 season. It includes their intensity on the Australian Tropical cyclone intensity scale, duration, name, areas affected, deaths, and damages. For most storms the data is taken from TCWC Nadi's and or TCWC Wellington's archives, however data for 03P has been taken from the JTWC/NPMOC archives as opposed to TCWC Nadi's or TCWC Wellington's, and thus the winds are over 1-minute as opposed to 10-minutes.

|-
|  ||  || bgcolor=#| || bgcolor=#| || bgcolor=#| || Cook Islands ||  ||  ||
|-
|  ||  || bgcolor=#| || bgcolor=#| || bgcolor=#| || ||  ||  ||
|-
|  ||  || bgcolor=#| || bgcolor=#| || bgcolor=#| || || None || None ||
|-
|  ||  || bgcolor=#| || bgcolor=#| || bgcolor=#| || Vanuatu || None || None ||
|-
|  ||  || bgcolor=#| || bgcolor=#| || bgcolor=#| || Vanuatu || None || None ||
|-
|  ||  || bgcolor=#| || bgcolor=#| || bgcolor=#| || || None ||  ||
|-
|  ||  || bgcolor=#| || bgcolor=#| || bgcolor=#| || Solomon Islands ||  ||  ||
|-

References

External links 

 
South Pacific cyclone seasons
Articles which contain graphical timelines
Tropical cyclones in 1985
Tropical cyclones in 1986